The Lottie Project is a children's novel by English author Jacqueline Wilson. It is illustrated by Nick Sharratt. The book is different from most Jaqueline Wilson books, as they are mostly told by characters who are not popular in school and are usually bullied by the popular students.

Plot
Charlotte Alice Katherine Enright (who prefers to be called Charlie, but is called Charlotte by her current teacher) is an eleven-year-old girl who lives with her mother, Jo, in a flat. She is the most popular girl in her school and because of that, she has a lot of friends. And of which her two best friends are called Angela Robinson and Lisa Field. When her class's form teacher, Mrs. Thomas, goes on maternity leave, she is replaced by a strict woman called Miss Beckworth, whom Charlie immediately dislikes. She calls Charlie by her birth name, Charlotte (even though that Charlie explained that everybody calls her Charlie) and she also forces Charlie to sit next to an intelligent boy, James Edwards, whom Charlie hates. Miss Beckworth sets the class a history project on the Victorians, and Charlie assumes that the topic will be boring and decides not to listen for the first lesson – until she finds a picture of a Victorian servant girl who looks just like her. Charlie decides to write a diary, told from the point of view of her character Lottie who is eleven years old, like Charlie; however she has left school to become a servant!

Jo loses her job as a shop manageress (who used to be in charge of a staff of twelve, at Elite Electricals) and has to take up cleaning in a supermarket, cleaning houses, and looking after a young boy called Robin to earn money to pay for her flat and mortgage. Jo takes a shine to Robin's single father, Mark, much to Charlie's despair - though Jo insists he is just a friend. Following a trip to a theme park, Charlie and Robin witness Mark and Jo kissing on a ride - though and they are both embarrassed afterwards. Charlie, upset by this, tells Robin that neither of his parents (Robin's mother's new partner does not get on with Robin) want him any more. Distressed, Robin runs away, leaving Mark and Jo distraught for the boy's safety, and Charlie guilt-ridden.

In a subplot, Lottie, the servant girl Charlie had created, gets a job as a nursery maid, looking after three young and very irritating children – Victor, Louisa and baby Freddie. Whilst at the park, Freddie is snatched from his pram after Lottie angrily storms off. Lottie is upset and distressed at the loss of the little boy, mirroring Charlie's own feelings towards the disappearance of Robin.

Robin is found in a train station behind packages waiting to be delivered. He is freezing and is rushed to hospital. Mark is very upset with Charlie (after she admits to him, Jo and the police what she had said to Robin) and even though Charlie is relieved that Robin is no longer missing, she is still distraught as he catches pneumonia.

Awards and nominations
1998, Stockport School's Book Award, winner.
1998, Sheffield Children's Book Award, highly commended.
1998, Oak Tree Award, Nottingham Children's Book Award, shortlisted.
1998, Red House Children's Book Award, shortlisted.

Theatrical adaptation
The story has also been adapted for the stage by former  Words and Pictures host Vicky Ireland and was first performed in 1999 at Polka Theatre, Wimbledon, England.

Release details
1997, United Kingdom, Doubleday,  & , 1 May 1997, hardback
1998, United Kingdom, Corgi,  & , 4 June 1998, paperback
1998, United Kingdom, Chivers Children's Audio Books,  & , March 1998, compact cassette
2006, United Kingdom, BBC Audiobooks, ASIN 1846070910, 3 April 2006, compact disc
Also published in other countries
2010, Book of the month in The Official Jacqueline Wilson Mag

References 

British children's novels
1997 British novels
Novels about bullying
Novels about teenage pregnancy
Novels by Jacqueline Wilson
Doubleday (publisher) books
1997 children's books